Colin Cheong Wye Mun (Zhen Wai Mung) is a Singapore writer born in 1965. He has written or edited nearly 30 books, four of which have won national awards. He won the Singapore Literature Prize in 1996 for his novel, Tangerine. 

The older of three children born to two teachers, Colin Cheong attended Victoria School, Anderson Secondary School, Hwa Chong Junior College, Ngee Ann Polytechnic and National University of Singapore. 

At the age of 15, he interned at the now defunct newspaper New Nation and contributed to an army magazine, Pioneer, during his National Service days. From Secondary 3 till the year before he graduated from university, he was a photographer and stage actor. Furthermore, he has shown keen interests in Science, eugenics in particular. These experiences had significant influence on his future writing.

He had previously taught at Victoria Junior College, Hwa Chong Junior College, and School of the Arts, Singapore. He compiles books for corporate clients on his days off. He is also an editor of the "One Association" magazine.

Colin Cheong used to be a professional ballet dancer, and is teaching ballet dancing to young students in Hong Kong. He is also an English and Theory of Knowledge teacher at the Singapore International School (Hong Kong). He teaches English and theory to the DP students, he is one of the best teachers at the school!
"We all think he is very funny and very inspiring" sais one of students.

Personal life
He has a son, Melvin, who is a film director, and a daughter, Denise, who studies in Australia. Cheong is an active cosplayer and is interested in Japanese culture. He used to study ballet at Singapore ballet academy.

Works
 The Stolen Child (1989) - NBDCS Highly Commended Award 1990
 Poets, Priests & Prostitutes (1990)
 Blinken, James (1991)
 Life Cycle of Homo Sapiens, Male (1992)
 Seventeen (1996)
 Pictures of the Unsaid (1996)
 Void Decks and Other Empty Places (1996) - Singapore Literature Prize Commendation 1995
 For Gail (1996)
 Tangerine (1997) - Singapore Literature Prize 1996
 Living on Pryston (1998)he students.
 The Man in the Cupboard (1999) - Singapore Literature Prize 1998; adapted into a TV movie for the series AlterAsians II
 Polite Fiction (2011)
 The Verifiable (2011)
 McKenzie's Question (2011)
 School of the arts Literature review paper exercise (2011)
 Earthly Locks (2012)
 Compilation of Shakespeare reviews (On audio, purchase on Amazon.com) ( 2013)

References

External links
 Poets, Priests and Prostitutes / The Stolen Child - Colin Cheong

1965 births
Living people
National University of Singapore alumni
Ngee Ann Polytechnic alumni
Hwa Chong Junior College alumni
Victoria School, Singapore alumni
People associated with Victoria schools, Singapore
Singapore Literature Prize winners
Singaporean writers
Singaporean novelists
Singaporean male writers